Kowloon is a station on the  and the  of Hong Kong's MTR. It is one of the two Airport Express stations providing in-town check-in services for passengers departing from Hong Kong International Airport and free shuttle bus services to most major hotels in the Tsim Sha Tsui and Yau Ma Tei areas.

Escalators link Elements directly with the station concourse.

History 

The station was designed by TFP Farrells. During the planning stage, it was called West Kowloon station.

On 16 September 2000, the new shopping mall "Dickson CyberExpress" was opened by Dickson Poon. The size was  spread over four levels of the station with six shopping areas. However, the mall did not have the expected volume of customers and business was weak. After half a year, the mall shrank in size. The mall's management company planned to decrease the level of the mall from 4 levels to 3 levels and to combine some of the shopping areas. Business remained poor due to sparse population near the station and a recession at that time. The mall finally closed its operation in 2005.

The station was proposed as the terminus of the unbuilt East Kowloon line; the proposal indicated using a reserved confined space under the Tung Chung line platforms.

The station is connected to West Kowloon Terminus of the Guangzhou–Shenzhen–Hong Kong Express Rail Link Hong Kong section.

Station layout 

As in other Airport Express stations, the Airport Express and the Tung Chung line have separated paid areas.

Entrances and exits 

Tung Chung line Concourse (G)
A - Station Car Park 
B - Airport Express Shuttle Bus 
C and D - Elements mall
C1 - Public transport interchange, Cross Boundary Coach Terminus, Elements, International Commerce Centre 
C2 - Sorrento, The Arch, The Harbourside, The Waterfront 
D1 - Elements mall
D2 - Sorrento, International Commerce Centre, The Arch, The Harbourside, The Waterfront
Airport Express In-town Check In (G)
E1-E5 - West Kowloon Cultural District, West Kowloon Waterfront Promenade, Western Harbour Crossing bus stops

References

External links
 

MTR stations in Kowloon
Airport Express (MTR)
Tung Chung line
Railway stations in Hong Kong opened in 1998
Terry Farrell buildings